Cycling in Prague is a popular leisure activity and a not so common mode of transport within the capital city of the Czech Republic. However, levels of utility cyclists have been rising recently. In 2018, 2% of people commuted by bike in Prague (4% in summer, less than 2% in winter).

History 
Prague was never considered as a bike-friendly city. There are no signs of any cycling infrastructure before WW1. In 1956, the first Copenhagen-style bicycle lanes appeared in Letňany on Letňanská street. The former bike lane is now used as a pedestrian walkway. Cycling infrastructure was usually not part of developing big housing panel house estates such as Jižní Město. The first modern bicycle path in Prague was built in 1986 in Stromovka park. Its intended use was recreational cycling.

After the Velvet Revolution, there was substantial pressure to improve the infrastructure intended to be used by cars. Car traffic in the city doubled in the first five years after 1989. Popularity of leisure cycling also increased, the first city cycle routes were marked by the Czech Tourist Club. In 1993, the Council of Prague approved a plan of constructing 400 km of cycling routes in Prague until 2000. However, only less than half of the planned bicycle routes were completed in 2000. The first critical mass cycling in Prague was held in 1991 with around 80 participants. In 2007, a voluntary association in favor of pedestrians and cyclists, Auto*Mat, was established. Furthermore, there is the magazine called „Prahou na kole", translated as „Prague by Bike", which includes an online cycling map.

Bike sharing 
As of 2021, there are four bikesharing companies operating in Prague. Most of the Prague bikesharing systems function only seasonally, in winter 2020/2021, Rekola and Nextbike operated in wintertime. The table is showing operators and size of their bicycle fleet as of June 2022.

Bicycles in public transport 
Bike transportation is free on Prague Metro, ferries, Petřín hill funicular, in some trams and buses. In metro, bicycles can be transported on the first and last decks of each subway car. Bicycle on trams is allowed only outside of city center, with time exceptions. If person wants to transport a bike in a Prague train, ticket for oversized luggage is needed. Specific spaces for the bikes are marked on from outside of the train. Only two bus lines allow carrying bicycles, as of 2019, those are lines 147 (to Suchdol) and Airport Express.

Gallery

References

External links 
 Cycling map of Prague, website Prahou na kole

 
Prague